Hydro Flask is a water bottle brand owned by American conglomerate Helen of Troy Limited. The brand became popular during mid-to-late 2019 and early 2020. Hydro Flask is particularly well known among millennials and zoomers, as well as college students and the "VSCO girl" subculture; social influencers and celebrities, especially on TikTok, increased the brand's popularity. Hydro Flask's prominence has played a role in the rising environmental and health consciousness of millennials and zoomers and has influenced the quality and appearance of other reusable water bottles.

History
Hydro Flask was founded as Steel Technologies, LLC in 2009 by Travis Rosbach and his then-girlfriend, Cindy Weber, due to his dissatisfaction with commercial water bottles. The couple moved to Bend, Oregon, from Oahu, Hawaii, to market their products; the company was successful at local farmers markets, especially among the outdoor recreation community.

The brand grew when it became available in stores; around this time, Weber and Rosbach broke up, and they sold their company shares to an investor. In 2012, tech executive Scott Allan became president and chief executive of the company. Allan expanded the company into Europe, launched new products, and increased marketing on social media.

Scott Allan retired in March 2020, stating "the goals that I initially aspired to accomplish have largely been achieved"; his responsibilities were distributed to Helen of Troy's divisional leadership.

Products
Although Hydro Flask is best known for its water bottles, it produces other items, such as wine tumblers, food jars, tote bags, and cooler bags. Its water bottles are stainless steel, manufactured mostly in China, and use double-wall vacuum insulation to help keep liquids cold or hot. As of October 2019, Hydro Flask offered customizable water bottles in 14 colors. The company also offers different cap types and sizes and regularly releases limited-edition bottle designs.

References

2009 establishments in Oregon
Bend, Oregon
Products introduced in 2009